Hatching is a 2022 Finnish psychological body horror film directed by Hanna Bergholm, written by Ilja Rautsi and starring Siiri Solalinna, Sophia Heikkilä, Jani Volanen, Reino Nordin and Saija Lentonen. It premiered at the 2022 Sundance Film Festival on January 23, 2022, and in theaters and on streaming on April 29, 2022. It won the Grand Prix and the Prix du Jury Jeunes at the Festival international du film fantastique de Gérardmer 2022.

The film centers on Tinja, a young gymnast desperate to please her mother, a woman obsessed with presenting the image of a perfect family to the world through her popular blog. One day, Tinja finds a mysterious egg, which she chooses to bring home. Once it hatches, she names the creature within "Alli", and cares for it as it grows into a doppelgänger that acts upon Tinja's repressed emotions.

Plot
12-year-old Tinja practices gymnastics, an activity `imposed upon her by her mother, a former figure skater turned influencer. One day a crow flies through a window and wrecks the family's living room. Tinja captures the crow to set it free outside but her mother asks for the bird and then snaps its neck. Saddened, Tinja disposes of the crow in the trash can, not noticing that it is still moving. Afterwards, she meets a new neighbor, a girl named Reetta and her French Bulldog.

That night, Tinja is awakened by cawing. She discovers the grievously-injured crow in the woods and puts it out of its misery by beating it with a stone. She then notices the crow's egg; feeling guilty at leaving it without a mother, Tinja brings the egg home and incubates it underneath a pillow, and later, as it grows bigger, inside a stuffed animal.

At practice, Tinja struggles, but is encouraged by her coach, who tells her that if she improves, she can participate in an upcoming competition. When Tinja returns home, she catches Mother in an intimate embrace with another man. Mother introduces him as Tero, later explaining her actions as needing to do something for herself. Reetta joins Tinja at the next practice, and proves to be very talented. This causes Mother to pressure Tinja into practicing until her hand is blistered and bleeding. That night, Tinja pets the egg with her injured hand.

Later, the egg hatches into a strange skeletal creature resembling a baby bird, which soon escapes, returning the next evening with a lingering injury from a piece of broken glass. She names the creature Alli and lets it sleep underneath her bed. As Tinja sleeps, she becomes annoyed by Reetta's dog's barking, and has visions of going next door. She wakes to find Alli on top of her with the dog's decapitated corpse beside her. When this makes her vomit, Alli eats it. Tinja hides Alli in the wardrobe and buries the dog in the flower bed, not knowing Matias is watching her.

At school, Tinja and Reetta have become friends, putting up missing posters for the dog together. That evening, when Mother gives Tinja a hairbrush and does not give Matias anything, he gets angry and digs up the dog's corpse, blaming Tinja. Matias then sneaks into Tinja's room, wearing a mask, to try to find out what's under the bed. Alli slashes the mask in fear. Downstairs, Tinja begins to have a seizure, indicating that they are psychically linked. That night, Matias tells Mother that Tinja is a monster, but Mother brushes it off as a nightmare.

The next day, Mother is displeased when Reetta wins the competition spot. Alli tracks down Reetta on her way home and brutally attacks her, while Tinja has another seizure. Tinja finds Alli's molted beak and realizes the creature is beginning to look more like her. Later Tinja brings Reetta flowers but is horrified by the severity of her injuries and amputated left hand. When Reetta sees her, she screams until Tinja flees. Tinja returns home and punishes Alli by slapping herself. Alli comforts her, holding her to its breast while she cries; in the morning, Alli looks fully human save for the pupils.

With Reetta is being hospitalized, Tinja is given her spot in competition. Mother suggests she and Tinja stay with Tero to relieve Tinja's pre-competition stress; Father reveals that he knows about Tero. At Tero's, Tinja learns that he is a widower with an infant named Helmi. Spending time with Tero, Tinja begins to become happy, as Tero does not need his life to be or look perfect.

Later, when Tinja is feeding Alli, Tero interferes and the creature attacks him, injuring his hand. Despite this, he forgives Tinja and covers for her, suspecting that she doesn't really want to compete or be a gymnast. When Mother fusses over Helmi and makes Tinja jealous, she becomes fearful that Alli will attack them while she is gone, but cannot convince Mother to let them attend the competition.

At the event, Mother records Tinja's performance for her blog. As Tinja begins her routine, she becomes linked to Alli, who has taken Tero's axe to kill Helmi. Tinja sabotages herself and falls, injuring her wrist, which stops Alli. Tero, who has witnessed Alli's attack, throws them out, telling Mother that Tinja has serious problems. Before they leave, Mother rams her head into the steering wheel, screaming and giving herself a bloody nose while she blames Tinja for destroying her happiness.

At home, Father ignores Mother's bloody nose. Tinja tries to prevent Alli from coming home, pushing her out of her bedroom window. Father sees Alli and mistakes her for Tinja but leaves after Alli crawls behind a shrub. Tinja finds Mother recording an update; Tinja promises Mother she will be better. Later, Mother finds what she thinks is Tinja huddled in the closet and forcibly brushes her hair, unaware that it's actually Alli. After ripping a chunk of Alli's hair out with the brush, Alli attacks her. Tinja intervenes and Alli flees, screaming so loud that the sides of her jaw rip open.

Tinja explains that all the recent chaos is because of Alli, and they hunt her. In Tinja's room, the creature overpowers Mother, who stabs it in the leg, also injuring Tinja. Tinja tries to explain that she hatched it, but Mother attacks again anyway, only to realize she has instead stabbed Tinja, who has jumped in front of Alli to protect her. Tinja collapses onto Alli and dies, her blood entering the creature's mouth and completing her change. Alli pushes Tinja's corpse to one side, her eyes now fully human and mouth healed. Then she croaks out "Mother" and stands up, looking down at her.

Cast
Siiri Solalinna as Tinja / Alli
Sophia Heikkilä as Mother
Jani Volanen as Father
Reino Nordin as Tero
Oiva Ollila as Matias
Ida Määttänen as Reetta
Saija Lentonen as Coach
Stella Leppikorpi as Gym Friend
Hertta Nieminen as Gym Friend
Aada Punakivi as Gym Friend
Jonna Aaltonen as Alli (Early Stages 1)
Hertta Karen as Alli (Early Stages 2)
Miroslava Agejeva as Baby Helmi

Production

Development
Director Hanna Bergholm began casting around 2018. Casting for the role of Tinja was described as challenging due to it being a demanding dual role, as the actor would be required to portray both Tinja and the monster Alli.

Filming was slated to begin in July 2019.

Special effects 
The creature was portrayed by an animatronic puppet, created by lead animatronic designer Gustav Hoegen and his team. As the monster evolves, instead of the puppet, it is played by different performers. The special effects make-up was designed by Academy Award-nominated effects artist Conor O'Sullivan.

Release and marketing
In June 2020, IFC Midnight acquired distribution rights. The plan was to first release the film at a major international festival in 2022 before releasing it in cinemas and VOD platforms. It premiered at the 2022 Sundance Film Festival on January 23, 2022.

A trailer was released in February 2021. Brad Miska of Bloody Disgusting commented on the trailer, comparing it favorably to the 1990 film Meet the Applegates and writing that it "sits comfortably toward the top of my must-see list." IndieWires Eric Kohn also made mention of the film in their list of Cannes 2021 predictions, writing that it "could appeal to fans of the Swedish monster movie, 'Border' — which won the Un Certain Regard prize at Cannes in 2018 — but with an extra dose of commentary of the social media curation of one's lives so many of us engage in."

The film received a limited theatrical release on April 29, 2022, before being released on streaming a week later on May 6.

Reception

References

External links
 
 Hatching at Rotten Tomatoes
 
 

Finnish horror films
IFC Films films
2022 horror films
2020s psychological horror films
Body horror films
2020s Finnish-language films
Gymnastics films